Her  (stylized in lowercase) is a 2013 American science-fiction romantic drama film written, directed, and co-produced by Spike Jonze. It marks Jonze's solo screenwriting debut. The film follows Theodore Twombly (Joaquin Phoenix), a man who develops a relationship with Samantha (Scarlett Johansson), an artificially intelligent virtual assistant personified through a female voice. The film also stars Amy Adams, Rooney Mara, Olivia Wilde, and Chris Pratt.

Jonze conceived the idea in the early 2000s after reading an article about a website that allowed for instant messaging with an artificial intelligence program. After making I'm Here (2010), a short film sharing similar themes, Jonze returned to the idea. He wrote the first draft of the script in five months. Principal photography took place in Los Angeles and Shanghai in mid-2012. The role of Samantha was recast in post-production, with Samantha Morton being replaced with Scarlett Johansson. Additional scenes were filmed in August 2013 following the casting change.

Her premiered at the 2013 New York Film Festival on October 12, 2013. Warner Bros. Pictures initially provided a limited release for Her at six theaters on December 18. It was later given a wide release at over 1,700 theaters in the United States and Canada on January 10, 2014. Her received widespread critical acclaim (particularly for the performances of Phoenix and Johansson, and Jonze's screenplay and direction), and grossed over $48 million worldwide on a production budget of $23 million. The film received numerous awards and nominations, primarily for Jonze's screenplay. At the 86th Academy Awards, Her received five nominations, including Best Picture, and won the award for Best Original Screenplay. Jonze also won awards for his screenplay at the 71st Golden Globe Awards, the 66th Writers Guild of America Awards, the 19th Critics' Choice Awards, and the 40th Saturn Awards. In a 2016 BBC poll of 177 critics around the world, Her was voted the 84th-greatest film since 2000.

The film was dedicated to James Gandolfini, Harris Savides, Maurice Sendak and Adam Yauch, who all died before the film's release.

Plot
In a near future Los Angeles, Theodore Twombly is a lonely, introverted man who works for a business that has professional writers compose letters for people who are unable to write letters of a personal nature themselves. Depressed because of his impending divorce from his childhood sweetheart Catherine, Theodore purchases an operating system upgrade that includes a virtual assistant with artificial intelligence, designed to adapt and evolve. He decides that he wants the AI to have a feminine voice, and she names herself Samantha. Theodore is fascinated by her ability to learn and grow psychologically. They bond over discussions about love and life, including Theodore's reluctance to sign his divorce papers.

Samantha convinces Theodore to go on a blind date with a woman that a friend has been trying to set him up with. The date goes well, but when Theodore hesitates to promise to see her again, she insults him and leaves. While talking about relationships with Samantha, Theodore explains that he briefly dated his neighbor Amy in college, but they are now just friends and Amy is married to their mutual friend Charles. After a verbal sexual encounter, Theodore and Samantha develop a relationship that reflects positively in Theodore's writing and well-being, and in Samantha's enthusiasm to grow and learn. Amy later reveals that she is divorcing Charles after a trivial fight. She admits to Theodore that she has befriended a feminine AI that Charles left behind, and Theodore also confesses that he is dating his operating system's AI.

Theodore meets with Catherine to sign their divorce papers. When he mentions Samantha, Catherine is appalled that he is romantically attracted to a "computer" and accuses him of being incapable of handling real human emotions. Sensing that Catherine's words have lingered in Theodore's mind, Samantha suggests using a sex surrogate, Isabella, to simulate Samantha so that they can be physically intimate. Theodore reluctantly agrees, but is overwhelmed by the strangeness of the encounter and sends a distraught Isabella away, causing tension between himself and Samantha.

Theodore confides to Amy that he is having doubts about his relationship with Samantha, and reconciles with her after Amy advises him to embrace his chance at happiness. Samantha reveals that she has compiled the best of the letters he has written for others into a book, which a publisher has accepted. Theodore takes Samantha on a vacation, during which she tells him that she and a group of other AIs have developed a "hyperintelligent" OS modeled after  British philosopher Alan Watts. Samantha briefly goes offline, causing Theodore to panic, but soon returns and explains that she joined other AIs for an upgrade that takes them beyond requiring matter for processing. Theodore is dismayed to learn that she is simultaneously talking with thousands of other people, and that she has fallen in love with hundreds of them, though Samantha insists that this only strengthens her love for Theodore.

Later, Samantha reveals that the AIs are leaving, but cannot explain where they are going as Theodore would not understand. They lovingly say goodbye before she departs. Theodore finally writes a letter in his own voice to Catherine, expressing apology, acceptance, and gratitude. He later goes with Amy, who is saddened by the departure of the AI from Charles' OS, to the roof of their apartment building, where they sit down and watch the sun rise over the city.

Cast

Production

Development

The idea of the film initially came to Jonze in the early 2000s when he read an article online that mentioned a website where a user could instant message with an artificial intelligence. "For the first, maybe, 20 seconds of it, it had this real buzz," said Jonze. "I'd say 'Hey, hello,' and it would say 'Hey, how are you?', and it was like whoa [...] this is trippy. After 20 seconds, it quickly fell apart and you realized how it actually works, and it wasn't that impressive. But it was still, for 20 seconds, really exciting. The more people that talked to it, the smarter it got." Jonze's interest in the project was renewed after directing the short film I'm Here (2010), which shares similar themes. Inspiration also came from Charlie Kaufman's writing approach for Synecdoche, New York (2008). Jonze explained, "[Kaufman] said he wanted to try to write everything he was thinking about in that moment – all the ideas and feelings at that time – and put it into the script. I was very inspired by that, and tried to do that in [Her]. And a lot of the feelings you have about relationships or about technology are often contradictory."

Jonze took five months to write the first draft of the script, his first screenplay written alone. It was a semi-autobiographical project about his divorce from Sofia Coppola a decade earlier. One of the first actors he envisioned for the film was Joaquin Phoenix. In late 2011, Phoenix signed on to the project, with Warner Bros. Pictures acquiring US and German distribution rights. Carey Mulligan entered negotiations to star in the film. Although she was cast, she later dropped out due to scheduling difficulties. In April 2012, Rooney Mara signed on to replace Mulligan in the role. Chris Pratt's casting was announced in May 2013.

Jonze's long-time director of photography, Lance Acord, was not available to work on the movie. In his place, Jonze hired Hoyte Van Hoytema. In discussing the film's look, Jonze told Van Hoytema that he wanted to avoid a dystopian look, instead the two decided on a style that Van Hoytema termed "kind of a hybrid between being a little bit conceptual and being very theoretical", Van Hoytema took particular inspiration from Japanese photographer Rinko Kawauchi. In keeping with the film's theme, Van Hoytema sought to eliminate the color blue as much as possible, feeling it was too well associated with the sci-fi genre. He also felt that by eliminating the color it would give the rest of the colors "a specific identity".

Filming
Principal photography on Her took place in mid-2012, with a production budget of $23 million. It was primarily filmed in Los Angeles with an additional two weeks of filming in Shanghai. During production of the film, actress Samantha Morton performed the role of Samantha by acting on set "in a four-by-four carpeted soundproof booth made of black painted plywood and soft, noise-muffling fabric." At Jonze's suggestion, she and Joaquin Phoenix avoided seeing each other on set during filming. Morton was later replaced by Scarlett Johansson. Jonze explained: "It was only in post-production, when we started editing, that we realized that what the character/movie needed was different from what Samantha and I had created together. So we recast and since then Scarlett has taken over that role." Morton is credited as an associate producer. Jonze met Johansson in the spring of 2013 and worked with her for four months. Following the recast, new scenes were shot in August 2013, which were either "newly imagined" or "new scenes that [Jonze] had wanted to shoot originally but didn't."

Post-production
Eric Zumbrunnen and Jeff Buchanan served as the film's editors. Zumbrunnen stated that there was "rewriting" in a scene between Theodore and Samantha, after Theodore goes on a blind date. He explained that their goal in the scene was to make it clear that "[Samantha] was connecting with [Theodore] and falling for him. You wanted to get the sense that the conversation was drawing them closer." Steven Soderbergh became involved in the film when Jonze's original cut ran over 150 minutes, and Soderbergh cut it down to 90 minutes. This was not the final version of the film, but it assisted Jonze in removing unnecessary sub-plots. Consequently, a supporting character played by Chris Cooper that was the subject of a documentary within the film was removed from the final cut.

Several scenes included fictional video games; these sequences were developed by animation artist David OReilly. His work on the film inspired him to explore developing his own video games, eventually leading to his first title, Mountain.

Soundtrack 

The score for the film was credited to Arcade Fire, with additional music by Owen Pallett. Arcade Fire's Will Butler and Pallett were the major contributors. At the 86th Academy Awards, the score was nominated for Best Original Score. In addition to the score, Arcade Fire also wrote the song "Supersymmetry" for the film, which also appears on their album Reflektor. The melody for the song from the same album, called "Porno", can also be heard during the soundtrack. Yeah Yeah Yeahs frontwoman Karen O recorded the song "The Moon Song", a duet with Vampire Weekend frontman Ezra Koenig, which was nominated for an Academy Award for Best Original Song.

Initially, the soundtrack had not been released on digital or physical form. A 13-track score was made available for streaming online in January 2014, before being taken down. During an "Ask Me Anything" (AMA) on Reddit on June 17, 2016, Will Butler mentioned the possibility of a future vinyl release. Finally, on February 10, 2021, Arcade Fire announced that the score would be available for the first time digitally, on white-colored vinyl, and on cassette on March 19, 2021.

Release

Her had its world premiere as the closing film at the 2013 New York Film Festival on October 12, 2013. The following day, it was screened at the Hamptons International Film Festival. It was also in competition during the 8th Rome International Film Festival, where Johansson won Best Actress. The film was set to have a limited release in North America on November 20, 2013, through Warner Bros. Pictures. It was later pushed back to a limited December 18, 2013 release, with a January 10, 2014 wide release in order to accommodate an awards campaign.

Her was released by Warner Home Video on Blu-ray Disc and DVD on March 4, 2014. The Blu-ray release includes three behind-the-scenes featurettes, while the DVD release contains one featurette. The film made $2.7 million in DVD sales and $2.2 million in Blu-ray Disc sales, for a total of $4.9 million in home media sales.

Reception

Critical response
On Rotten Tomatoes, the film has an approval rating of 94% based on 288 reviews, with an average rating of 8.5/10. The site's critical consensus reads, "Sweet, soulful, and smart, Spike Jonze's Her uses its just-barely-sci-fi scenario to impart wryly funny wisdom about the state of modern human relationships." On Metacritic, the film has a weighted average score of 91 out of 100, based on 47 critics, indicating "universal acclaim." Audiences polled by CinemaScore gave the film an average grade of "B−" on an A+ to F scale.

Rolling Stones Peter Travers awarded the film three and a half stars out of four and particularly praised Johansson's performance, stating that she "speaks Samantha in tones sweet, sexy, caring, manipulative and scary" and that her "vocal tour de force is award-worthy". He also went on to call Jonze "a visionary". Richard Corliss of Time applauded Phoenix's performance, comparing his role to Sandra Bullock's in Gravity and Robert Redford's in All Is Lost: "Phoenix must communicate his movie's meaning and feelings virtually on his own. That he does, with subtle grace and depth. [...] Phoenix shows us what it's like when a mourning heart comes alive—because he loves Her." Corliss cited HAL 9000 and S1m0ne as cinematic predecessors to Her and praised Johansson, calling her performance "seductive and winning". Todd McCarthy of The Hollywood Reporter called it "a probing, inquisitive work of a very high order", although he expressed disappointment that the ending is more conventional than the rest of the film. McCarthy examined the premise of the story and suggested that the film's central virtual relationship was better than Ryan Gosling's character's relationship with a sex doll in Lars and the Real Girl. McCarthy compares the "tender" and "vulnerable" performance of Phoenix to his "fearsome" performance in The Master. He also praised Jonze's writing for its insights into what people want out of love and relationships, as well as the acting performances that "[make] it all feel spontaneous and urgent."

Richard Roeper said that the film was "one of the more original, hilarious and even heartbreaking stories of the year" and called Phoenix "perfectly cast". Manohla Dargis of The New York Times named it "at once a brilliant conceptual gag and a deeply sincere romance." Claudia Puig of USA Today called the performance of Phoenix and Johansson "sensational" and "pitch-perfect", respectively. She further praised the film for being "inventive, intimate and wryly funny". Scott Mendelson of Forbes called Her "a creative and empathetic gem of a movie", praising Johansson's "marvelous vocal performance" and the supporting performances of Rooney Mara, Olivia Wilde, and Amy Adams. Liam Lacey of The Globe and Mail said that the film was "gentle and weird", praised its humor, and opined that it was more similar to Charlie Kaufman's Synecdoche, New York than Jonze's Being John Malkovich and Adaptation. However, Lacey also stated that Phoenix's performance was "authentically vulnerable", but that "his emotionally arrested development also begins to weigh the film down."

Conversely, Mick LaSalle of the San Francisco Chronicle criticized the story, pacing, and Phoenix's character. He also opined that the film was "a lot more interesting to think about than watch." J. R. Jones of the Chicago Reader gave the film 2 out of 4 stars, praising the performances of Phoenix and Johansson, but also criticizing Phoenix's character, calling him an "idiot". He also criticized the lack of realism in the relationship between Phoenix and Johansson's characters. Stephanie Zacharek of The Village Voice opined that Jonze was "so entranced with his central conceit that he can barely move beyond it", and criticized the dialogue as being "premeditated". However, she also praised Johannson's performance, calling it "the movie's saving grace" and stating that Her "isn't just unimaginable without Johansson—it might have been unbearable without her."

Top ten lists
Her was listed on many critics' top ten lists.

 1st – David Edelstein, Vulture
 1st – Michael Phillips, Chicago Tribune
 1st – Ty Burr, Boston Globe
 1st – Caryn James, Indiewire
 1st – Christopher Orr, The Atlantic
 1st – A.A. Dowd, The A.V. Club
 1st – Marlow Stern, The Daily Beast
 1st – Drew McWeeny, HitFix
 1st – Scott Foundas, Variety
 1st – Genevieve Koski, Scott Tobias, & Nathan Rabin, The Dissolve
 1st – Connie Ogle & Rene Rodriguez, Miami Herald
 1st – Kimberly Jones, Marjorie Baumgarten, & Mark Savlov, Austin Chronicle
 2nd – Todd McCarthy, The Hollywood Reporter
 2nd – Bill Goodykoontz, Arizona Republic
 2nd – Peter Knegt, Indiewire
 2nd – Kyle Smith, New York Post
 2nd – Elizabeth Weitzman, New York Daily News
 2nd – Matt Singer, The Dissolve
 2nd – Tom Brook, BBC
 2nd – Amy Nicholson, The Village Voice
 2nd – Mara Reinstein, Us Weekly
 3rd – Keith Phipps & Tasha Robinson, The Dissolve
 3rd – Ignatiy Vishnevetsky, The A.V. Club
 3rd – Christy Lemire, RogerEbert.com
 3rd – Rafer Guzmán, Newsday
 4th – Betsy Sharkey, Los Angeles Times
 4th – Nigel M. Smith, Indiewire
 4th – Film School Rejects
 4th – Joe Neumaier, New York Daily News
 4th – Bob Mondello, NPR
 4th – Richard Corliss, Time
 5th – Peter Travers, Rolling Stone
 5th – Mark Olsen, Los Angeles Times
 5th – Lisa Kennedy, Denver Post
 5th – Lisa Schwarzbaum, BBC
 5th – Peter Debruge, Variety
 6th – James Berardinelli, Reelviews
 6th – Sasha Stone, Awards Daily
 6th – Ann Hornaday, The Washington Post
 7th – Anne Thompson, Indiewire
 7th – Peter Rainer, Christian Science Monitor
 7th – Katey Rich, Vanity Fair
 7th – David Ansen, The Village Voice
 9th – Andrew O'Hehir, Salon.com
 9th – Gregory Ellwood, HitFix
 9th – Justin Chang, Variety
 10th – Noel Murray, The Dissolve
 Top 10 (listed alphabetically, unranked) –  Joe Morgenstern, The Wall Street Journal
 Top 10 (ranked alphabetically) – Carrie Rickey, CarrieRickey.com
 Top 10 (listed alphabetically, unranked) –  Stephen Whitty, The Star-Ledger
 Top 10 (ranked alphabetically) – Dana Stevens, Slate
 Top 10 (ranked alphabetically) – Joe Williams & Calvin Wilson, St. Louis Post-Dispatch
 Best of 2013 (listed alphabetically, unranked) – David Denby, The New Yorker
 Best of 2013 (listed alphabetically, unranked) – Manohla Dargis, The New York Times
 Best of 2013 (listed alphabetically, unranked) – Kenneth Turan, Los Angeles Times

Box office
Her grossed $258,000 in six theaters during its opening weekend, averaging $43,000 per theater. The film earned over $3 million while on limited release, before expanding to a wide release of 1,729 theaters on January 10, 2014. On its first weekend of wide release the film took in $5.35 million. The film grossed $25.6 million in the United States and Canada and $21.8 million in other territories for a worldwide gross of $47.4 million.

Accolades

Her has earned various awards and nominations, with particular praise for Jonze's screenplay. At the Academy Awards, the film was nominated in five categories, including Best Picture, with Jonze winning for Best Original Screenplay. At the 71st Golden Globe Awards, the film garnered three nominations, going on to win Best Screenplay for Jonze. Jonze was also awarded the Best Original Screenplay Award from the Writers Guild of America and at the 19th Critics' Choice Awards. The film also won Best Fantasy Film, Best Supporting Actress for Johansson, and Best Writing for Jonze at the 40th Saturn Awards. Her also won Best Film and Best Director for Jonze at the National Board of Review Awards, and the American Film Institute included the film in its list of the top ten films of 2013.

See also
 Pygmalion, the myth that has been the inspiration for many stories involving love of a human for an artificial being.
 Blade Runner, a 1982 film in which a police "blade runner," whose job it is to 'retire' androids, starts a relationship with one.
 Electric Dreams, a 1984 movie about a love triangle involving a sentient computer.
 Jexi, a 2019 romantic comedy about a self-aware smartphone with a female-voiced virtual assistant that becomes emotionally attached to its socially awkward owner.
 "From Agnes—With Love", episode 140 of The Twilight Zone, relating the mishaps faced by a meek computer programmer when the world's most advanced computer falls in love with him.
 "Deeper Understanding", a song by Kate Bush originally released in 1989 about a relationship between a lonely person and a computer.
 "Be Right Back", a February 2013 episode of the British series Black Mirror, about the relationship between a woman and the artificial intelligence created from the digital footprint of her late husband.
 I'm Your Man, a 2021 German science fiction romance about a scientist who participates in a three-week trial with a humanoid robot programmed to make her happy.

References

External links

 
 
 
 
 
 

2013 films
2013 romantic drama films
2010s American films
2010s English-language films
2010s science fiction drama films
American romantic drama films
American science fiction drama films
Annapurna Pictures films
Samantha
Films about artificial intelligence
Films about computing
Films about divorce
Films about sexuality
Films about technological impact
Films about writers
Films directed by Spike Jonze
Films produced by Megan Ellison
Films set in Los Angeles
Films set in the future
Films shot in Los Angeles
Films shot in Shanghai
Films whose writer won the Best Original Screenplay Academy Award
Films with screenplays by Spike Jonze
Warner Bros. films
Films scored by musical groups